The Kurnbudj ctenotus (Ctenotus kurnbudj)  is a species of skink found in the Northern Territory in Australia.

References

kurnbudj
Reptiles described in 1986
Taxa named by Ross Allen Sadlier
Taxa named by John C. Wombey
Taxa named by Richard W. Braithwaite